Schlögl is a German language occupational surname. Notable people with the name include:

 Karl Schlögl (1924–2007), Austrian chemist
 Luis Schlögl, Austrian luger 
 Robert Schlögl (1954), German chemist

References 

German-language surnames
Occupational surnames
Surnames from nicknames